HMS Alacrity was a modified Black Swan-class sloop of the Royal Navy. She was built for service as a convoy escort during the Second World War, but was completed too late to see action. She did subsequently take part in the Korean War between 1950 and 1952. She was scrapped in 1956.

Construction and design
Alacrity was one of two Modified-Black Swan-class sloops ordered by the British Admiralty from the Scottish shipbuilder William Denny and Brothers on 12 August 1942 as part of the 1942 shipbuilding programme for the Royal Navy. The ship was laid down at Denny's Dunbarton shipyard on 5 April 1943, was launched on 1 September 1944, and completed on 13 April 1945.

Two Admiralty three-drum water-tube boilers provided steam to Parsons geared steam turbines which drove two shafts.

The ship's main gun armament (as fitted to all the Modified Black Swans) consisted of 3 twin QF 4 inch (102 mm) Mk XVI guns, in dual purpose mounts, capable of both anti-ship and anti-aircraft use. Close-in anti-aircraft armament varied between the ships of the class, with Alacrity completing with an outfit of 2 twin 40 mm Bofors guns and two single Oerlikon 20 mm cannon.  Post war the ship's close-in armament changed to 2 twin and 2 single Bofors guns. Anti-submarine armament consisted of a split Hedgehog anti-submarine mortar, mounted either side of the 'B' 4-inch mount, together with 110 depth charges.

Royal Navy service
On commissioning Alacrity, which was assigned the pennant number U60, completed work up in home waters, before being allocated for service in the Far East with the British Pacific Fleet, sailing for the Pacific via the Mediterranean, where she carried out further training. Alacrity arrived in Colombo after the Surrender of Japan at the end of the War.

Following the war she remained in the Far East and underwent a refit in New Zealand in 1946. She received the new pennant number 'F60' and was part of the 1st Escort Flotilla. In 1949 the Flotilla was designated the 3rd Frigate Flotilla.

In 1950 she was deployed with United Nations Naval forces for service in the Korean War. She returned to Portsmouth in 1952 and was placed in reserve, before being put on the disposal list in 1956.

She was subsequently sold for scrap to W H Arnold Young at Dalmuir and arrived for breaking up there on 15 December 1956.

References

Publications

External links
 Alacrity at Naval History.net
 Alacrity at U-boat.net

 

Black Swan-class sloops
Ships built on the River Clyde
1944 ships